Guijarro is a surname of Spanish origin, meaning 'pebble'. People with that name include:

 Alberto Redondo Guijarro (born 1997), Spanish footballer
 Alejandro Guijarro (born 1979), Spanish contemporary artist
 Antonio Aparisi Guijarro (1815-1872), Spanish politician and journalist
 David Antón Guijarro (born 1995), Spanish chess grandmaster
 Gonzalo Guijarro (born 1996), known simply as Gonzalo, Spanish footballer
 Josep Guijarro (born 1967), Spanish writer, ufologist and journalist
 Manuel Guijarro Doménech (born 1963), Spanish former racing cyclist
 Patricia Guijarro (born 1998), Spanish footballer
 Sergio Sestelo Guijarro (born 1978), Spanish footballer
 Sheila Guijarro (born 1996), Spanish footballer
 Txema Guijarro García (born 1975), Spanish economist and politician

See also
 Casas de Guijarro, a municipality in Cuenca, Castile-La Mancha, Spain
 Fort Guijarros, a California Historical Landmark
 

Surnames of Spanish origin